The Glen Orden Sports Club is an Australian rules football club which compete in the WRFL  since 1979. They are based in the Melbourne suburb of Werribee.

History
Glen Orden Sports Club began in 1979. The club has Football, Cricket and Fishing. They spent many years in the A3 division - this division was for smaller clubs who were unable to field two teams and hosted the third XVIII of the Division A1 clubs.

In 2017 the club went in recess (senior team) because of a shortage of players. The club was able to recover and fielded senior and reserve sides in season 2018.

 The club continued to field teams in its juniors, girls, women’s competitions.

Premierships
 Western Region Football League
 Div 2 (2): 2006, 2013
 Div 3 (2): 1992, 2019

Bibliography
 History of the WRFL/FDFL by Kevin Hillier – 
 History of football in Melbourne's north west by John Stoward –

References

External links
Official Facebook

Australian rules football clubs in Melbourne
Australian rules football clubs established in 1979
1979 establishments in Australia
Western Region Football League clubs
Werribee, Victoria
Sport in the City of Wyndham